Brosna could refer to:
Brosna, County Kerry, is a small village in Kerry

Brosna, County Offaly, a hamlet in County Offaly, Ireland
River Brosna, Ireland

See also
Little Brosna River